The first round of the Louisiana House election of 2006 were held on Tuesday, November 7, 2006. The terms of all seven Representatives to the United States House of Representatives will expire on January 3, 2007, and will be put up for contest. The winning candidates will serve a two-year term from January 3, 2007 to January 3, 2009.  If necessary, a runoff round will be held on December 9, 2006.

Louisiana uses a unique voting system to determine its representation in the U.S. Congress.  Elections in Louisiana—with the exception of U.S. presidential elections—follow a variation of the open primary system  called the jungle primary.  Candidates of any and all parties are listed on one ballot; voters need not limit themselves to the candidates of one party. Unless one candidate takes more than 50% of the vote in the first round, a run-off election is then held between the top two candidates, who may in fact be members of the same party.  This means that the outcome of some races might not be known until over a month later than the rest of the country.

The Louisiana races, especially those in the southern portion of the state, were impacted to some extent as a result of Hurricane Katrina, as well as Hurricane Rita, both of which have caused massive damage within Louisiana. For example, most of New Orleans' majority African-American communities were displaced by Katrina.

All Louisiana Congressmen won re-election and avoided a run-off except Democrat William Jefferson of New Orleans, under investigation for corruption. He won a run-off against fellow Democrat Karen Carter. As of 2020, this is the last election in which Democrats won more than one congressional district in Louisiana.

Note: For calculating the totals of the Democratic and Republican parties with regard to the 2nd district, the jungle primary results, not the runoff results, are used.

District 1

Incumbent Republican Congressman Bobby Jindal, first elected in 2004, faced no serious challenge from Democratic challengers David Gereighty, an electrical engineer, and Stacey Tallitsch, a computer engineer, or from Libertarian opponent Peter Beary. This highly conservative district is based around Lake Pontchartrain and the suburbs of New Orleans and Jindal was re-elected with nearly ninety percent of the vote.

District 2

This staunchly liberal district, based mainly within the city of New Orleans, has elected Bill Jefferson to Congress consecutively since 1990. Seeking his ninth term in Congress, Jefferson was largely unpopular due to the fact that he was under federal investigation for corruption charges at the time, and therefore, a great many candidates emerged to challenge him. On the Democratic side, State Representative Karen Carter, State Senator Derrick Shepherd, New Orleans City Councilman Troy Carter, Orleans Parish School Board attorney Regina Bartholomew, John Edwards, Scott Barron, former congressional candidate Vinny Mendoza, and D.C. Collins ran. Republicans Joe Lavigne, an attorney; Eric Bradley; Lance von Uhde and Libertarian Rhumbline Kahn also ran, creating a very crowded race. On October 14, the Louisiana State Democratic party voted to endorse Karen Carter. In the first line of balloting, no candidate received a majority of the votes, so the top two candidates, Jefferson and Carter, advanced to a second line of balloting, which Jefferson ultimately won by a comfortable margin, despite the corruption charges against him.

District 3

Incumbent Democratic Congressman Charlie Melançon won his first term 2004 by defeating Billy Tauzin III, the son of the retiring Congressman by only 569 votes, leading many to conclude that he was vulnerable to a Republican challenger. State Senator Craig Romero emerged as Melançon's chief competitor, though Democrat O.J. Breech and Libertarian James Blake also ran, but ultimately fell to Melançon by a surprisingly comfortable margin in this solidly conservative district based in the southern suburbs of New Orleans and south-central Louisiana.

District 4

This district, based in northwestern Louisiana and greater Shreveport, is staunchly conservative and has consistently re-elected incumbent Republican Congressman Jim McCrery with solid margins since his initial election in 1988. This year proved to be no different, and Congressman McCrery walloped Democrats Artis Cash and Patti Cox and Republican Chester Kelley with over fifty-seven percent of the vote.

District 5

Incumbent Republican Congressman Rodney Alexander was initially elected to this conservative, northeast Louisiana district in 2002 as a Democrat, but switched to the Republican Party in 2004 and was re-elected for the first time as a Republican. In 2006, he was re-elected in a landslide over Democrat Gloria Hearn, Libertarian Brent Sanders, and independent John Watts.

District 6

This conservative district is based around the Baton Rouge metropolitan area and was represented by Republican Congressman Richard Baker. Baker sought his eleventh term in Congress and faced no Democratic challenger, but did square off against Libertarian candidate Richard Fontanesi, a contest that he won in an overwhelming landslide.

District 7

Incumbent Republican Congressman Charles Boustany sought a second term in this conservative district based in the Cajun, southwest portion of the state. Boustany's initial election in 2004, to replace previous Congressman Chris John was relatively close and attracted national attention. In 2006, he faced Democratic nominee Mike Stagg, and the contest proved to be relatively uneventful, with Boustany winning a second term with over seventy percent of the vote.

References

See also 
2006 United States elections
2006 United States House of Representatives elections

Louisiana
2006
2006 Louisiana elections